Louis-Pierre-Alphonse Bichebois, sometimes called Louis-Philippe-Alphonse Bichebois, born in Paris, France, on 14 April 1801 and died on April 17, 1851 in the same city, was a French engraver and lithographer specializing in landscapes.

He was a student of Jean-Baptiste Regnault and Jean-Charles-Joseph Rémond.

Selected pieces

References

External links

1801 births
1851 deaths
19th-century French painters